Professional Humoredian is the debut album by comedian Doug Benson, released by ASpecialThing Records

Track listing
 "Hey Everybody" – 3:51
 "Doggie" – 1:27
 "Ginormous" – 1:49
 "Sex" – 3:17
 "Cookies" – 0:41
 "Weed" – 4:02
 "Amazing Memory" – 4:11
 "Anti-Truth" – 1:45
 "Melting" – 1:26
 "I Love Movies" – 4:42
 "Super High Me" – 7:59
 "Life Tips" – 5:13
 "Happy Couples" – 1:30
 "What Women Want" – 4:20
 "Observational Comedy" – 4:20

References

2008 debut albums
2000s comedy albums
ASpecialThing Records albums
Doug Benson albums